The Krebs Group is a geologic group in Oklahoma. It preserves fossils dating back to the Carboniferous period.

See also

 List of fossiliferous stratigraphic units in Oklahoma
 Paleontology in Oklahoma

References

 

Geologic groups of Oklahoma
Carboniferous System of North America